Reginald Arthur Lord (29 January 1905 – 10 June 1997) was an English first-class cricketer.

Lord was born at Beckenham in January 1905. He was educated at Marlborough College, before going up to St John's College, Oxford. While studying at Oxford, he made his debut in first-class cricket for Oxford University against Middlesex at Oxford in 1924. He made two further appearances in first-class cricket, making a further appearance for Oxford against the Free Foresters in 1925, before playing against Oxford for H. D. G. Leveson-Gower's XI at Eastbourne in 1926. He scored 57 runs in his three first-class matches, with a high score of 21. He later served in the Second World War with the Royal Air Force, enlisting as a pilot officer in August 1940. He was promoted to the rank of flight lieutenant in November 1941, while in January 1943 he was made a temporary squadron leader. He resigned his commission nine years after the conclusion of the war, in July 1954, retaining the rank of squadron leader. Following the war, he taught for nearly fifty years at the St Bede's School, Eastbourne. He was still teaching four mornings a week in 1993, when he was 88. He died in June 1997 at Willingdon, Sussex.

References

External links

1905 births
1997 deaths
Alumni of St John's College, Oxford
Cricketers from Beckenham
English cricketers
H. D. G. Leveson Gower's XI cricketers
Oxford University cricketers
People educated at Marlborough College
Royal Air Force officers
Royal Air Force personnel of World War II
Schoolteachers from Sussex